Mollie Elizabeth Gallagher (born 11 December 1997) is an English actress. She is known for portraying the role of Nina Lucas in the ITV soap opera Coronation Street. For her portrayal of Nina, Gallagher has won several awards including "Best Newcomer" at the Inside Soap Awards and "Serial Drama Performance" at the National Television Awards. In January 2023, she began competing in the fifteenth series of Dancing on Ice.

Life and career
Gallagher was born on 11 December 1997 in Swinton, Salford. She studied drama at a college in Manchester before moving to London to study at the Academy of Live and Recorded Arts. During her studies, Gallagher worked as a seat filler at the National Television Awards. After graduating, Gallagher joined the cast of the ITV soap opera Coronation Street as Nina Lucas. Her character was introduced in November 2019 as the long-lost niece of established character Roy Cropper (David Neilson) who eventually ends up living with him following the death of her father. Her storylines on the show have included being the victim a of a hate crime which resulted in the death of the character's boyfriend Seb Franklin (Harry Visinoni) and later entering a relationship with Asha Alahan (Tanisha Gorey), the former of which won the award for Best Storyline at the 2021 Inside Soap Awards. Gallagher has also won the awards for Serial Drama Performance at the 26th National Television Awards and Best On-Screen Partnership alongside Neilson at the Inside Soap Awards in 2021. In January 2023, Gallagher began competing in the fifteenth series of Dancing on Ice. Her participation in the series was confirmed on Lorraine in October 2022.

Filmography

Awards and nominations

References

External links
 

1997 births
Living people
English soap opera actresses
English television actresses
English people of Irish descent
Actresses from Salford
Actresses from Greater Manchester
21st-century English actresses